Haug is a surname which appears most commonly in Germany and Norway. The Norwegian name Haug derives the old Norse word haugr which can be translated to mean hill, knoll, or mound. The German surname Haug has a different etymology, probably short form of names beginning with Hug- "intelligence, understanding, spirit" (cf. Hugo, Hugbert, etc.). Other derivatives include Haugan, Hauge, Haugedal, Haugen and Haugland, all of which are common Norwegian surnames. The surname Haug is shared by several notable people:

People
Agnes Nygaard Haug (born 1933), Norwegian judge
Anne Haug (born 1983), German professional triathlete
Andrew Haug (born 1973), Australian market announcer and heavy metal musician
Birger Haug (1908–1981), Norwegian high jump
Bjørn Haug (born 1928), Norwegian judge
Dr. med. Christian Dietrich Haug (born 1971), German-Newzealandian physician and psychiatrist, travel journalist
Émile Haug (1861–1927), French geologist
Espen Haug (footballer born 1970) Norwegian footballer, now youth-coach at Strømmen IF
Felix Haug (1952–2004), Swiss musician
Friedrich Haug (1761-1829), German poet
Hans Haug (1900–1967), Swiss composer
Horst Haug (born 1946), German football player
Ian Haug (born 1970), Australian lead guitarist in the bands Powderfinger and The Church (band)
Jochen Haug (born 1973), German politician
Jutta Haug (born 1951), German politician
Knut Haug (born 1934), Norwegian politician
Martin Haug (1827–1876), German Orientalist
Monthei Eriksen Haug (born 1861), Norwegian politician
Norbert Haug (born 1952), German executive responsible for Mercedes-Benz's motorsport activities
Sverre Haug (1907–1943), Norwegian resistance
Thorleif Haug (1894–1934), Norwegian skier
Wolfgang Fritz Haug (born 1936), German Marxist philosopher
Cindy Haug (born 1956), Norwegian experimental and children's writer
Jacob Hvinden Haug (1880–1961), Norwegian military officer
Linn Haug (born 1990), Norwegian snowboarder
Marius Nygaard Haug (born 1960), Norwegian jurist

Surnames from given names